Patrick F. Kilbane (born November 5, 1969) is an American actor, comedian, and screenwriter best known for his three seasons as a cast member on MADtv (1997–2000), as well his memorable appearance in the 1996 "The Bizarro Jerry" episode of Seinfeld, in which he played Bizarro Kramer. Kilbane's first book, The Brain Eater's Bible: Sound Advice for the Newly Reanimated Zombie, was released on March 18, 2011.

Life and career
Kilbane was born in Lakewood, Ohio and attended Beloit College, graduating in 1990. He majored in French and he began work as a stand-up comedian. Kilbane is an alumnus of the Sigma Chi International Fraternity. After graduation, he toured the Midwest for four years, spending over 40 weeks a year on the road. Kilbane would later move to Los Angeles, where he would act in commercials for Budweiser (fighting an "evil" refrigerator), The Single Guy, and HBO's Arli$$.

After spending 3 seasons as a cast member on MADtv, Kilbane appeared with small and supporting roles in films such as Monkeybone, Evolution, and Meet Dave. In 2003, Kilbane was considered for his own sketch comedy show on Comedy Central called The Pat Kilbane Show. A pilot episode was filmed and produced. However, Comedy Central ended up passing on greenlighting the pilot to the series. In late 2004, Kilbane opened Wexford Hill Hobbies on Stroop Road in Kettering, Ohio. The store specialized in gaming hobbies including role-playing, tabletop, and miniature games. In 2007, he sold the store and it was renamed KrystalKeep by new owners. Kilbane currently resides in Woodland Hills, California. In 2008, Kilbane reprised his Howard Stern impersonation on an episode of Frank TV.

More recently, Kilbane spent several years working with DreamWorks helping developing science fiction concepts for television. He also wrote the humorous sci-fi/horror book, "Brain Eaters Bible: Sound Advice for the Newly Reanimated Zombie", which was released on March 18, 2011. In 2012, a "Brain Eaters Bible" app for the iPad was released.

In April 2012, Kilbane moderated a web series for SOFREP.com titled "Inside The Team Room". This web series featured three United States Navy Seals, including the now-deceased Chris Kyle.

MADtv
Kilbane joined the cast of MADtv in 1997 as a featured performer, for the third season. However, when David Herman left the show mid-season, Kilbane was later promoted to a repertory performer status. Kilbane was known for many popular characters, such as the frequently appearing Stan McNer, a coffee addict with bulging eyes. Others include Nick Bendix, actor of Rocket Revengers, the Sheriff's deputy (The Son of Dolemite). He also became the second cast member to portray the Spishak salesman (David Herman was the first).

Kilbane impressed with numerous impersonations, which included Al Gore, Howard Stern, Luke Perry, Marilyn Manson, Sean Connery, Mel Gibson (as Martin Riggs from Lethal Weapon), Arnold Schwarzenegger, Jay Leno, Jack Nicholson, Desi Arnaz (as Ricky Ricardo from I Love Lucy), Michael Richards (as Cosmo Kramer from Seinfeld), Bob Saget, Donald Trump, Tom Bergeron, Ted Koppel, Robin Williams, Antonio Banderas, Leonard Nimoy (as Mr. Spock), Rob Zombie, Charlton Heston, Andy Griffith, Tommy Tune, Michael Imperioli (as Christopher Moltisanti from The Sopranos), Billy Bob Thornton (as Karl Chiders from Sling Blade), Stone Phillips, Michael Eisner, Brad Pitt, Don Knotts (as Ralph Furley from Three's Company), Keith Richards, and Ray Bolger (as the Scarecrow from The Wizard of Oz).

Despite being a cast member on MADtv, Kilbane did not limit himself and often did side projects. While on a summer hiatus from MADtv, he co-starred in the Universal film New Jersey Turnpikes with Kelsey Grammer and former MADtv castmember Orlando Jones. After three years on the show, Kilbane left MADtv at the end of season five.

Characters

Filmography

Television

Web

References

External links
Official website 

1969 births
American male film actors
American impressionists (entertainers)
American male television actors
Beloit College alumni
Living people
People from Lakewood, Ohio
American sketch comedians
Comedians from Ohio
21st-century American comedians